Yakup I of Germiyan (died after 1327) was the Turkmen founder of the Germiyanid beylik in Kütahya. He was the son of Kerimüddin Alişir and was succeeded by Mehmed I of Germiyan.

Reign 
He refused to recognize the authority of Mesud II and swore allegiance to the Ilkhanids, which led to the establishment of his state. He gathered a significant amount of power and raided westwards, forcing the local Byzantine Empire to pay tribute for some time. He lost Alaşehir to a force of Byzantine mercenaries from Catalonia, but retook it in 1314. He also conquered Ayasluğ (present Selçuk) and Angir (present Simav). He established a number of foundations and mosques in Afyon.

References 
 Büyük Larousse, vol. 24, p. 12368, Milliyet Gazetesi Yayınları, "Yakup Bey I"

Turkic rulers
1327 deaths
People from Kütahya
History of Kütahya Province
Germiyan
Year of birth unknown